German submarine U-803 was a Type IXC/40 U-boat built for Nazi Germany's Kriegsmarine during World War II at Bremerhaven.

Design
German Type IXC/40 submarines were slightly larger than the original Type IXCs. U-803 had a displacement of  when at the surface and  while submerged. She had two shafts and two  propellers.

U-803 was fitted with six  torpedo tubes (four fitted at the bow and two at the stern), 22 torpedoes, one  SK C/32 naval gun, 180 rounds, and a  Flak M42 as well as two twin  C/30 anti-aircraft guns. The boat had a complement of forty-eight.

Service history
She was completed in September 1943 and spent the next seven months on working up cruises in the Baltic Sea near Swinemünde in order to get the crew and boat ready for operational cruising in the Battle of the Atlantic, which was at a critical stage.

As the boat worked up on 27 April 1944, just days off its intended first cruise, she struck a sea mine in the bay and sank, nine of her crew going down with the boat, and 35 being rescued by nearby ships. The boat was salvaged in August 1944, but was too badly damaged to repair, and was broken up for components for use in other U-boats. Her surviving crew were largely transferred to other units, principally , on which they surrendered in May 1945. The mine had been air-dropped over the bay by the Royal Air Force, who had realised the use that the area was being put to through photo-reconnaissance flights. The air-dropping of mines was a frequent tactic of the RAF, and achieved dividends off many German harbours.

References

Bibliography

External links

World War II submarines of Germany
World War II shipwrecks in the Baltic Sea
German Type IX submarines
U-boats sunk by mines
U-boats commissioned in 1943
U-boats sunk in 1944
1943 ships
Ships built in Bremen (state)
Maritime incidents in April 1944